Rutherford College (formerly named Rutherford High School from 1961 to 2001) is a co-educational state secondary school on the Te Atatū Peninsula, Auckland, New Zealand. It is named after New Zealand-born nuclear physicist and chemist Ernest Rutherford.

History 

The school opened in 1961, and rapidly developed as the farms and orchards of Te Atatū were developed into housing. The school was the first in New Zealand to offer drama and dance as school subjects.

Curriculum 

Rutherford College  is a New Zealand Qualifications Authority accredited co-educational Year 9–13 State Secondary school. It caters for students from year 9 to year 13, as well as providing adult education, special education and night courses. It offers well-qualified, professional staff are very successful in challenging students to achieve academic success in national assessments. The school teaches core subjects such as English, Mathematics and Science, and helps senior students pass NCEA (National Certificate of Educational Achievement). As well as core subjects, specialist subjects such as Chinese Mandarin, Japanese, Māori and German are taught as a second language, as well as aviation, environmental science and biochemistry, arts, physical education, technology, accounting and economics.

Tradition 

The College encourages student participation in a wide range of extracurricular activities, again challenging students to reach their full potential in all areas.

 The school celebrates annually, Rutherford Day, to commemorate the achievements of Lord Rutherford.
 The official school song is ‘Me Hui Hui’, written by Pita Sharples
 Another school song ‘The Rutherford Way’ was written by former school music teacher, Mrs Manu Fa'aea-Semeatu.
 The school has a strong bond with its sister school, Da Tong High School in Shanghai, China.
 Rutherford Colleges Kapa Haka group 'Te Rōpu Kapa Haka o Te Kōtuku' is also the top Mainstream group in the Auckland region.

Notable staff
 Chris Carter (born 1952), politician
 Cliff Edmeades (born 1941), principal (1989–2006)
 Jack Elder (born 1949), politician
 Dame June Mariu (born 1932), community leader

Notable alumni

Sport
 Ken Carrington – rugby union player
 Ron Cribb – rugby union player, expelled
 Kees Meeuws – rugby union player
 Sam Tuitupou – rugby union player
 Garth da Silva – boxer
 Darren Liddel – weightlifter
 Gavin Stevens – cyclist
 Henry Paul – rugby union and rugby league player
 Robbie Hunter-Paul – rugby league player
 Ivan Vicelich – association footballer
 Peter Webb – cricketer
 Yvonne Willering – netball player and coach

The arts
 The La De Da's – 1960s/70s rock band, including Kevin Borich, first formed at Rutherford High
 Oscar Kightley – TV personality, actor (Bro' Town, Sione's Wedding)
 Pio Terei – TV personality, actor and comedian

Public service
 Simon Bridges – Former Minister of Transport and former National Party leader and MP for Tauranga. (Also the former Head Boy of the school)
 Tim Shadbolt – Mayor of Invercargill, former Mayor of Waitemata City (one of the founding students of the school)
 Cindy Kiro – children's commissioner, academic, governor-general
Rawiri Waititi – Current Member of Parliament for Waiariki (New Zealand electorate), Co-Leader of the Te Paati Māori.

Notes

References
Te Kete Ipurangi
Education Review Office report

External links 
 Official Rutherford College Website
 Official Rutherford College Website: Open Source Section
 Rutherford College on Google Maps
 newzealandeducated.com – Rutherford College
 XTEND NZ – Rutherford College, Community Education, Adult Education, Night School Courses
 Old Friends – Rutherford College
 Rutherford College YouTube Channel

Educational institutions established in 1961
Secondary schools in Auckland
Henderson-Massey Local Board Area
1961 establishments in New Zealand
Schools in West Auckland, New Zealand